Marvin Ricardo Barrios Alvarez (born 22 February 1994) is a Honduran professional footballer who plays as a goalkeeper for Olimpia in the Honduran Liga Nacional.

Career 
Barrios made his professional debut with Motagua in a 2–0 Liga Nacional win over Platense F.C. on 5 August 2012.

Personal life
Barrios' half-brother, Alex Güity, is also a professional footballer.

References

External links
 

1994 births
Living people
People from Atlántida Department
Honduran footballers
Honduras youth international footballers
Association football midfielders
F.C. Motagua players
C.D. Olimpia players
Liga Nacional de Fútbol Profesional de Honduras players
Honduran Liga Nacional de Ascenso players